Charles Wanyoike Rubia (1923 – 23 December 2019) was the first native African mayor of Nairobi. He later joined Parliament, where he rose to the cabinet. In 1990, together with Hon. Kenneth Matiba, Rubia led the calls for multi-party democracy and was subsequently detained twice by President Daniel arap Moi. He was later released from detention after one year, and had been in poor health ever since.

He was an MP from Starehe Constituency in Nairobi from 1969 to 1988.

In July 2018, Murang'a University of Technology honoured the past Mayor of Nairobi with a Doctor of letters degree for his good work in mobilizing the community in the establishment of Murang'a college of Technology.

He died on 23 December 2019, aged 96, in his Karen home, in Nairobi.

References

External links
Human Rights Watch article referencing Charles Rubia

1923 births
2019 deaths
Mayors of Nairobi
People from Nairobi
Members of the National Assembly (Kenya)
Prisoners and detainees of Kenya
Government ministers of Kenya